Altglienicke (literally Old Glienicke) is a locality (Ortsteil) of Berlin in the borough (Bezirk) of Treptow-Köpenick. Until 2001 it was part of the former borough of Treptow.

History
The village of Glinik was first mentioned in 1375. The Berlin Wall cut through Altglienicke (in East Berlin) and Rudow (in West Berlin) from 1961 until 1990. It was also the location for a joint American and British intelligence operation, Operation Gold.

Geography

Position
The locality is situated in the south-western side of Treptow-Köpenick. It borders with Rudow (in Neukölln), Johannisthal, Adlershof, Grünau, Bohnsdorf and the municipality of Schönefeld, in the Dahme-Spreewald district of Brandenburg.

Subdivision
Altglienicke counts 1 zone (Ortslage):
 Falkenberg

Transportation
Altglienicke is served by the Berliner S-Bahn lines S45 and S9, with the stations of Altglienicke and Grünbergallee. Close to the locality is the BER Airport - Terminal 5 station, by the former "Berlin Schönefeld" international airport, which is now part of the Berlin Brandenburg Airport.

See also
Berlin Altglienicke railway station

References

External links

 Altglienicke official website

Localities of Berlin

Populated places established in the 1370s